Acasta is a genus of barnacles in the family Balanidae, containing the following species:

 Acasta alba Barnard, 1924
 Acasta alcyonicola Utinomi, 1953
 Acasta armata Gravier, 1921
 Acasta aspera Yu, Kolbasov, Hosie, Lee & Chan, 2017
 Acasta canaliculata (Ren & Liu, 1978)
 Acasta chejudoensis Kim & Kim, 1988
 Acasta clausa Yu, Chan, Achituv & Kolbasov, 2017
 Acasta conica Hoek, 1913
 Acasta coriolis Rosell, 1991
 Acasta crassa Broch, 1931
 Acasta cyathus Darwin, 1854 (sponge barnacle)
 Acasta daedalusa Kolbasov, 1993
 Acasta denticulata Hiro, 1931
 Acasta dentifer (Broch, 1922)
 Acasta echinata Hiro, 1937
 Acasta fenestrata Darwin, 1854
 Acasta flexuosa Nilsson-Cantell, 1931
 Acasta folliculus (Hiro, 1937)
 Acasta foraminifera Broch, 1931
 Acasta fragilis (Broch, 1931)
 Acasta gregaria Utinomi, 1959
 Acasta hirsuta Broch, 1916
 Acasta huangi Yu, Kolbasov, Hosie, Lee & Chan, 2017
 Acasta idiopoma Pilsbry, 1912
 Acasta infirma Kolbasov, 1992
 Acasta japonica Pilsbry, 1911
 Acasta koltuni Kolbasov, 1991
 Acasta longibasis (Hiro, 1937)
 Acasta madagascariensis Ren, 1989
 Acasta navicula (Darwin, 1854)
 Acasta newmani Van Syoc & Winther, 1999
 † Acasta fischeri Locard, 1877
 † Acasta formae de Alessandri, 1897
 † Acasta muricata Seguenza, 1876

References

Archaeobalanidae
Maxillopoda genera
Taxa named by William Elford Leach